Anastrophyllum hellerianum is a species of liverwort belonging to the family Anastrophyllaceae.

Synonyms:
 Isopaches hellerianus (Nees ex Lindenb.) H. Buch
 Jungermannia helleriana Nees ex Lindenb.
 Sphenolobus hellerianus (Nees ex Lindenb.) Stephani

References

Jungermanniales